WXLW (950 AM) is a commercial radio station in Indianapolis, Indiana.  It is owned by Pilgrim Communications LLC.  Along with sister station 95.9 WFDM-FM, it simulcasts a talk radio format, known as "Freedom 95."  The radio studios and offices are on Industrial Road off U.S. Route 31 in Franklin, Indiana.  After a local morning news and information show hosted by Todd Huff, the rest of the schedule is nationally syndicated talk hosts:  Glenn Beck, Sean Hannity, "The Ramsey Show with Dave Ramsey," Mark Levin, Joe Pags, Ben Shapiro, "Our American Stories with Lee Habeeb" and "This Morning, America's First News with Gordon Deal."

By day, WXLW is powered at 1,000 watts non-directional.  But to avoid causing interference to other stations on 950 AM, the power drops to 13 watts at night.  The transmitter is off West 56th Street near Georgetown Road on the northwest side of Indianapolis.

History

Early Years
On , WXLW first signed on.  It was originally on 1590 kilocycles, and was powered at 1,000 watts.  It used a non-directional single tower at its studio location on Kessler Blvd. at West 30th Street in Indianapolis.  The station was a daytimer until 1986, required to sign off the air at sunset.

Sister station WXLW-FM began broadcasting a few days after the AM station, August 27, 1948.  It broadcast on 94.7 MHz, now WFBQ.  WXLW-FM was a simulcast of the AM station's programs but continued to broadcast after sunset when the AM station had to be off the air. Both stations were owned by Radio Indianapolis, Incorporated.

In January 1955, WXLW moved to its current dial position at 950 kHz with an increase in power to 5,000 watts, using a directional antenna with a three-tower array.  WXLW-AM-FM's format was middle of the road (MOR) with local news updates.  The disc jockeys included Howard Dorsey, Greg Smith, Art Roberts and Bob Morrison.  WXLW also held an annual Watermelon Festival which featured musical acts like singing duo Homer and Jethro.  In the 1960s, the station featured a mobile studio, "The Traveler", that visited locations in Central Indiana promoting events for clients.

Top 40
Bill Shirk of Muncie, Indiana, owned WXLW in the 1970s through most of the 1980s. In the early to mid-1970s, the station programmed a high-energy Top 40 hit music format and the station was known as "Super XL".  One contest involved giving away Indiana Pacers basketballs, with the slogan "WXLW has balls!" In the mid-1970s Super XL had a higher market share than other full-time AM stations like WIFE (1310) and WNDE (1260).  

By 1976, the station changed to adult contemporary music with DJs including Joe Pickett, K.C. Jones, and Lou Sherman.  Steve Miller was program director through most of the period (1974–79).  For a brief time in 1979, WXLW tried a Sunday-only disco music format called "Space Station Shirk", which was hosted by Mark Edwards and Steve Miller.  In 1986, the Federal Communications Commission granted it limited-power nighttime operations.  From the late 1990s until 2002, WXLW switched to a Christian radio format.

Sports Radio
On July 8, 2002, shortly after 1260 WNDE switched from ESPN Radio to Fox Sports Radio, WXLW picked up the ESPN network affiliation and became a sports radio station.  WXLW aired ESPN programming for six years.  In the fall of 2006, the studios were moved from Monument Circle in downtown Indianapolis to a location on Industrial Road off U.S. Route 31 in Franklin. 

On January 7, 2008, ESPN Radio changed its Indianapolis affiliation from WXLW to newly-created Emmis Communications sports station WFNI 1070 AM.  With the loss of ESPN programming, WXLW became a Sporting News Radio affiliate and re-branded as "XL 950".  In August 2011, WXLW briefly became part of the Yahoo! Sports Radio network.  Notable past hosts on WXLW include Greg Rakestraw, now part of the Indianapolis Colts Radio Network and voice of the Indy Eleven, sportswriter Will Carroll, longtime Indiana Basketball Hall of Fame Executive Director Chris May, and Derek Schultz, who later hosted afternoons on former rival sports station WNDE after his departure in 2011.

Freedom 95
On September 10, 2012, WXLW changed its format to talk radio, simulcasting sister station WFDM-FM 95.9 MHz.  Because both stations are found at 95 on their respective dials (950 AM and 95.9 FM), they are branded as "Freedom 95".

References

External links
WXLW website

Indiana Radio Archive, WXLW
FCC History Cards for WXLW

XLW
Mass media in Indianapolis
Radio stations established in 1948
1948 establishments in Indiana